Robert McCarthy may refer to:

 Robert McCarthy (tennis) (born 1924), Australian tennis player
 Robert E. McCarthy (born 1940), American politician in the state of Massachusetts
 Robert I. McCarthy (1920–2007), American politician in the state of California
 Robert J. McCarthy, American hotel executive
 Robert W. McCarthy (1924–2015), American politician in the state of Illinois
 Bob McCarthy (born 1946), Australian rugby league footballer and coach
 Bob McCarthy (footballer) (born 1948), English footballer

See also
 Robert-Jon McCarthy (born 1994), Australian, naturalized Irish, road cyclist